Víctor Vázquez is a photographer and a contemporary conceptual artist born in San Juan, Puerto Rico. Víctor Vázquez has been working as an artist for more than 20 years, creating photographs, three-dimensional objects, videos and installation works in which the human body figures both conceptually and formally. Vázquez offers a series of semiotic constructs that navigate identity, ritual, politics and anthropological inquiry. Themes include the duality of language and meaning and the relationships between nature and culture. He was an artist in resident at Cuerpos Pintados, Fundacion America in Santiago, Chile, in the year of 2002 and at Proyecto ´ace Art Center in Buenos Aires in the year 2006.

Education
Received a BFA from the university of Puerto Rico and educated on the doctoral level at New York University before traveling to India, China and Japan to study art, literature and cultural history.

Work
Víctor Vázquez Works are a complex amalgam of different medium. They are often difficult to decipher, yet invariably yield layers of profound meaning. His range is broad, and although he is best known for his photographs, he is essentially a maker of objects, video and installation. Vázquez art has been focused in exploring ideas related with the construction of knowledge, history, Memory, identity and migration. The intention has been to investigate and reflect on how the state  imposes, reproduces and legitimizes acceptable social practices. His book "The Realm of Waiting", published in 1990 and produced by the Humanities of Art and the Ponce Museum of Art in Puerto Rico was awarded best book of art of the year by the Puerto Rico  Art Critic  Association for been one of the first works of art that has dealt with the Aid Epidemic in the United States.

His work has been shown in Paris, France, Germany, Amsterdam, Spain, New York City, Los Angeles, Chicago, Puerto Rico, the Caribbean and South America. He has participated in numerous biennial and Art Festival (notably, Habana Biennial, 1995-1997), Cuenca (1997), São Paulo (1995), Foto Fest (1994). His work is part of the collection of the Bibliothèque Nationale in Paris, the Museum of fine art in Houston, Texas, Museum of Art of Puerto Rico, and the Smithsonian Institution, OAS Art Museum in Washington DC.

Selected solo exhibitions
2011 - SLUCAG - Southeastern. Louisiana University Contemporary Art Gallery, Louisiana, United States (Curated by Dale Newkirk)
2009 - Displacement, Dislocation and Encounter. Seraphin Gallery, Philadelphia, United States
2008 - Tierra de Mudos. New York Photo Festival, Dumbo Art Center, Brooklyn, New York
Body to Body. Museo de Arte Contemporáneo Puerto Rico, Puerto Rico
2007 - Dialogues. Museo de Arte de Ponce, Ponce, Puerto Rico
2006 - Selected Works, Galerie Lina Davidov, Paris, France
Liquids and Signs. Espacio Proyecto ACE, Buenos Aires, Argentina
Liquids and Signs. Walter Otero Gallery, San Juan, Puerto Rico
2005 - Selected Works. Walter Otero Gallery, San Juan, Puerto Rico
El Ojo Ajeno. Photography Center, Lima, Peru
Liquids and Signs. Martha Schneider Gallery, Chicago, Illinois, United States
2004 - Liquids and Signs, Seraphin Gallery, Philadelphia, United States
2003 - Requiem for / by a Culture. Museo de Arte de Puerto Rico, San Juan, Puerto Rico
L.A. International Biennial Art Invitational. Couturier Gallery, Los Angeles, United States
Ancestros. Galerie Baudoin Lebon, Paris, France
Borders. Seraphin Gallery, Philadelphia, United States
2001 - Body and Memory. Installation, Galeria Universidad del Sagrado Corazón, San Juan, Puerto Rico
Recent Works. Seraphin Gallery, Philadelphia, United States
Selected Works. Galería de Arte Contemporáneo David Pérez-Mac Collum, Guayaquil, Ecuador
2000 - Cultura-Natura, Museo de las Américas, San Juan, Puerto Rico
Recent Works. Photography/Installation, Sicardi Gallery, Houston, Texas, United States
1999 - The House of Souls. Martha Schneider Gallery, Chicago, Illinois, United States
The House of Souls. Centro Wifredo Lam, Havana, Cuba
1997 - Body and the Bird. Martha Schneider Gallery, Chicago, Illinois, United States
Cuenca Biennial, Cuenca, Ecuador
1996 - Body and the Bird. Galería Botello, San Juan, Puerto Rico
1994 - The Self Portrait and Extended Body. Galería Botello, San Juan, Puerto Rico
1993 - The Realm of Waiting. Hostos Gallery, Hostos Community College, Bronx, New York, United States
1992 - The Realm of Waiting. Museo de Arte de Ponce, Ponce, Puerto Rico
1991 - Victor Vazquez’s Photography. Galería Latinoamericana, San Juan, Puerto Rico
1989 - Rites. Galería Latinoamericana, Photography Collection, San Juan, Puerto Rico
Rites. University of Puerto Rico, Recinto de Mayagüez, Puerto Rico
1987 - Eloquences : China and Its People, Liga de Arte, San Juan, Puerto Rico
1986 - Eloquences : China and Its People, Galeria Oller, University of Puerto Rico, San Juan, Puerto Rico

Awards
Angel Ramos Foundation Award, Prize of acquisition,  Museo de Arte Contemporáneo de Puerto Rico
Best Book Award of the year “The Realm of Waiting”, Puerto Rico Art Critics Association
Scholarship for Graduate Studies from New York University and New York State for Study abroad in India, China and Japan
Fellowship from Seton Hall University, New Jersey, United States

Collections
Artium Center, Museo Vasco de Arte Contemporáneo, Victoria Gasteiz, Spain
Museum of Art Fort Lauderdale (MOAFL), Fort Lauderdale, Florida, United States
Museum of Fine Arts Houston, Texas, United States
Museo de Arte Latinoamericano de Buenos Aires (MALBA), Argentina
Museo de Arte Contemporáneo de Puerto Rico, San Juan, Puerto Rico
The Smithsonian Institution, OAS Art Museum, Washington D.C., United States
Centro Wifredo Lam, Havana, Cuba
Casa Las Américas, Havana, Cuba
Lehigh Photography Collection, Lehigh, Pennsylvania, United States
ARTIS, Paris, France
El Museo del Barrio, New York, United States
Museum of Art of Puerto Rico, San Juan, Puerto Rico
Museum of Latin American Art (MoLAA), Los Angeles, United States
Museo de Historia, Antropología y Arte, University of Puerto Rico, Río Piedras, Puerto Rico
Point of Contact Gallery at Syracuse University, United States
Fundacion América, Santiago, Chile
Polytechnic University of Valencia, Valencia, Spain
Museo de Arte de Ponce, Ponce, Puerto Rico
Bibliothèque nationale de France, Paris, France

References

External links 
 
 Schneider Gallery
 Seraphin Gallery
 Walter Otero Gallery

People from San Juan, Puerto Rico
Puerto Rican artists
Puerto Rican photographers
Year of birth missing (living people)
Living people
New York University alumni